Cool Ridge is an unincorporated community in Raleigh County, West Virginia, United States. Cool Ridge has a post office with ZIP code 25825.

References

Unincorporated communities in Raleigh County, West Virginia
Unincorporated communities in West Virginia